Pilo Kristaq Keri (born December 25, 1956) is an architect and former member of the Parliament of Republic of Albania.

Professional career 
Keri was born in Kutalli, a village in Berat District in the present-day municipality of Ura Vajgurore. 
He studied Architecture at the University of Tirana, graduating in 1979. 
After a compulsory working year in Kukës, he was relocated as an Architect in the Institute of Pedagogical Studies (ISP) Tirana, where he stayed for three years. 
In 1984, he returned in Berat as member of the Project Bureau, for two years. 
In 1986, he joined the Communal Constructions Council of Kuçova where he would take the roles of Head of Engineers and Director. 
1995 - 2005 would be the years he dedicated to the private construction business in various regions of Albania, such as: Kuçova, Berat, Kavaja, Durres, Tirana, Elbasan etc. 
In 1999, he was amongst 15 architects from Albania selected to undertake a professional training, at Arizona State University. 
2005 would be the latest achievement in his long career when he was awarded the title of Doctor of Architecture from Leibniz University Institute of Arts and Science, USA.

Political career
Member of the 17th Parliament Legislature, from the Proportional List. 
Member of the Production and Environmental Parliamentary Commission. 
Member of the Parliamentary Commission for the "Investigation of Auction Procedures for the Construction of Durres-Morine" and for the "Investigation of the Expenses made from the State Budged towards Ministries from the years 2001 and Onwards".

References

Living people
1956 births
Members of the Parliament of Albania
People from Ura Vajgurore
Albanian architects
University of Tirana alumni